Damon is an extinct town in Wayne County, in the U.S. state of  Missouri. The GNIS classifies it as a populated place.

A post office called Damon was established in 1893, and remained in operation until 1903. The community has the name of Damon Taylor, a local merchant.

References

Ghost towns in Missouri
Former populated places in Wayne County, Missouri